Dr Nicholas O'Shiel, is the director and chief executive, Omagh Enterprise Company Ltd, Omagh, County Tyrone, Northern Ireland. In 2008, he was awarded the Queen's Award for Enterprise Promotion - the only honorary awardee that year.

References

Queen's Award for Enterprise Promotion (2008)
British businesspeople
Living people
Queen's Award for Enterprise Promotion (honorary)
Year of birth missing (living people)